Salsky (masculine), Salskaya (feminine), or Salskoye (neuter) may refer to:
Salsky District, a district of Rostov Oblast, Russia
Salskoye Urban Settlement, an administrative division and a municipal formation which the town of Salsk in Salsky District of Rostov Oblast is incorporated as
Salsky (rural locality) (Salskaya, Salskoye), several rural localities in Russia
Salskaya Hill, an extinct volcano near the town of Dalnerechensk in Primorsky Krai, Russia
Volodymyr Salsky (1885–1940), Ukrainian general and the head of the Ukrainian government in exile